The high-efficiency hybrid cycle (HEHC) is a new 4-stroke thermodynamic cycle combining elements of the Otto cycle, Diesel cycle, Atkinson cycle and Rankine cycle.

HEHC engines
The 3rd generation design of the Liquidpiston Engine currently in development is the only engine currently designed around the HEHC.  It is a rotary combustion engine.

References

External links
 LiquidPiston Inc. – The company designing the first HEHC-based engine
 MIT News article: "Small engine packs a punch" (December 5, 2014)
Thermodynamic cycles